The Miss District of Columbia Teen USA competition is the pageant that selects the representative for the District of Columbia in the Miss Teen USA pageant.

With only three semi-finalist placings, the District of Columbia is one of the least successful jurisdictions at Miss Teen USA.  One of those semi finalists, Miss District of Columbia Teen USA 2000 Tiara Christen Dews, was one of only three District of Columbia teens to win the Miss District of Columbia USA crown.

Asia Hickman of Washington, D.C. was crowned Miss District of Columbia Teen USA 2022 on June 4, 2022 at the Carpenter Theater in Richmond, Virginia. She will represente District of Columbia for the title of Miss Teen USA 2022.

Results summary

Placements
1st runner-up: Hannah Gillard (2021)
Top 10: Ni'Cole Bobbitt (1987), Tiara Dews (2000), Jacqueline Drakeford (2001)
District of Columbia holds a record of 4 placements at Miss Teen USA.

Awards
Miss Congeniality: Shirelle Robinson (1990)

Winners 

1 Age at the time of the Miss Teen USA pageant

References

External links

District of Columbia
Women in Washington, D.C.